Franco-Româna Brăila (AS Brăilița) is a football team from Brăila, Romania.

History
Their best performance was reaching the Quarter-finals in Cupa României in 1935–36 season when they lost with 6–4 against Unirea Tricolor București.

Franco-Româna Brăila second team was founded in 1940 and was called AS Brăilița.

Brăilița was also the neighbourhood and name of the stadium. The stadium was like a small English stadium looking same with the famous Highbury, but in a smaller size.

Even they won twice Divizia B they never promoted in Divizia A, because they could not manage to win the Promotion play-off.

The biggest rival in their history was another local team Dacia Unirea Brăila. Franco-Româna Brăila was in the shadow of the rival team in all of their history.

After they fold in 1948, another team was created in Brăila to replace them, a team called Progresul Brăila.

On 3 september 2022 the team was reestablished as AS Brăilița 1928 Franco-Româna. The team will perform only in Brăila County competitions.

Honours

Liga II:
Winners (2): 1935–36, 1939–40
Runners-up (2): 1934–35, 1940–41

Quarter-finals in Cupa României (1): 1935–36

References

Literature

External links
Romaniansoccer.ro

Association football clubs established in 1928
Association football clubs disestablished in 1948
Defunct football clubs in Romania
Football clubs in Brăila County
Liga I clubs
Liga II clubs
Brăila
1928 establishments in Romania
Works association football clubs in Romania